Georgeville is an unincorporated community in Livingston Parish, Louisiana, United States.

Georgeville Church
The historic Georgeville Church is located here.

References

Unincorporated communities in Livingston Parish, Louisiana
Unincorporated communities in Louisiana